Henri Martin may refer to:

Henri Martin (historian) (1810–1883), French historian
Henri-Jean Guillaume Martin (1860–1943), French impressionist painter
Henri Martin (French politician) (1927–2015), French communist leader
Henri Martin (American politician), State Senator, 31st Senate District, Connecticut
Henri Martin (winemaker) (1903–1991), French mayor of Saint-Julien, owner of Château Gloria and Château Saint-Pierre
Henri-Jean Martin (1924–2007), specialist on history of the book in Europe, history of writing and printing

See also
 Henry Martin (disambiguation)